The Rackleff Building is an historic commercial building at 127-133 Middle Street in the Old Port commercial district of Portland, Maine.  Built in 1867 to a design by architect George M. Harding, it is, along with the adjacent Woodman Building and Thompson Block (both also Harding buildings), part of the finest concentration of mid-19th-century commercial architecture in the city.  It was added to the National Register of Historic Places.

Description and history
The Rackleff Building is located in Portland's Old Port area, on the north side of Middle Street, west of Franklin.  It is flanked on the left side by the Woodman Building, and is separated on the right from the Thompson Block by Church Street, a narrow side street. The building is three stories in height and roughly a parallelogram in shape, with a rounded section at the sharply angled corner with Church Street.  The ground floor has a cast iron facade that is essentially the same as that of the Woodman building, but about one foot shorter.  Piers of clustered narrow round columns support arches and an entablature.  Windows on the upper levels are set in segmented-arch openings, with bracketed lintels and eared hoods that are joined by a stone stringcourse.  The windows in the center of the Middle Street facade are more ornately decorated, and the building has a cornice with paired brackets, and bands of freestone hexagons and quatrefoils between.  The Church Street facade has similar but simpler styling.

The building was constructed in 1867, the same year the other two buildings went up.  All were built in the wake of Portland's 1866 great fire.  Harding, who came to Portland in 1858, played a major role in the rebuilding of the city's commercial district after that blaze.

See also
National Register of Historic Places listings in Cumberland County, Maine

References

Commercial buildings in Portland, Maine
Commercial buildings on the National Register of Historic Places in Maine
Second Empire architecture in Maine
Commercial buildings completed in 1867
1867 establishments in Maine
National Register of Historic Places in Portland, Maine
Historic district contributing properties in Maine